Bartholomew Purvis (15 October 1919 – June 2001) was an English professional footballer who played in the Football League for Notts County, Carlisle United and Gateshead as a left back.

Career statistics

References 

English Football League players
Clapton Orient F.C. wartime guest players
English footballers
1919 births
Association football fullbacks
2001 deaths
Footballers from Gateshead
North Shields F.C. players
Everton F.C. players
Gateshead A.F.C. players
Reading F.C. players
Plymouth Argyle F.C. players
Notts County F.C. players
Carlisle United F.C. players
Hartlepool United F.C. players